This is a list of places where social nudity is practised in North America for recreation. This listing includes notable nude beaches and private resorts. This listing also includes places where female toplessness is permitted in jurisdictions where it is normally forbidden.

Anguilla
Nude bathing on beaches is illegal in Anguilla.
 Captain's Bay is a secluded beach where people do bathe in the nude (illegally).

Antigua and Barbuda
 Hawksbill Bay, Antigua

Bahamas
 Breezes Bahamas, Nassau used to allow nude bathing but as of January 2015 nudity is no longer allowed.

Belize
Though Belizeans don't particularly frown on nudity, there are no official nude beaches in Belize. However, there are dozens of deserted out islands with beaches perfect for sunbathing nude.

Canada

Alberta
 CottonTail Corner Naturist Beach, located 20 minutes from the City of Edmonton near the Town of Devon.  A 25-minute hike through the trees leads to the beach.
 Helios Nudist Association, less than an hour's drive east of Edmonton, is billed as North America's northernmost nudist camp.
 Sunny Chinooks Camping Association has a landed campground for members near Sundre. They have been in operation since 1952 and also host nude swims in Calgary for members during the winter.
 Weaslehead Nude Beach at the western edge of Calgary has been in operation for over two decades. As of 2020, an additional option is available at Hidden Beach at Fish Creek Provincial Park.

British Columbia
British Columbia has thousands of kilometres of coastline and thousands of lakes, as well as millions of hectares of natural parks and undeveloped land. The vast majority of these areas are mostly uninhabited and nude swimming and sunbathing can be done with little concern for disturbing others. In the populated areas, particularly the Lower Mainland, Greater Victoria, and the Okanagan, nudity is generally practiced only in certain established or isolated locations (usually beaches) and on private properties.

 Wreck Beach is the second largest clothing-optional beach in North America with over 100,000 visitors each year. On the shore of the Georgia Strait and the north arm of the Fraser River, it is part of Pacific Spirit Regional Park, which is adjacent to the University Endowment Lands, just west of the city limits of Vancouver.
 Crescent Rock Beach in Surrey; after political wrangling in 2006 nude sunbathing is now allowed.
 Red Sands Beach in Nelson is a nude beach used mainly by the locals. Camping is not permitted.
 Three Mile Beach in Penticton has traditionally been used as a clothing optional beach, but the legal status of nudists using the beach is unclear.
 Nipple Point in Salmon Arm is a rocky beach east of the town that sees occasional nude use.
 Little Tribune Bay, near the Tribune Bay Provincial Park on Hornby Island is a clothing optional sandy/small round gravel beach, close to the Co-op, camping nearby.
 Mission Flats Beach, Kamloops. Expansive sandy beach early spring and late summer based on the rise and fall of water levels. Very popular with couples as well as singles.
 Prior Lake on Vancouver Island near Victoria. From a backroad around Thetis Lake, there is access to this smaller lake which features a secluded dock that is clothing optional.
 Southern extremity of the beach (beyond the painted "nude" signs on fallen trees) at Witty's Lagoon Regional Park in Metchosin near Victoria.
 Sol Sante Club is a naturist club located on a  property near Cobble Hill, north of Victoria on Vancouver Island.
 Van Tan Club is a naturist club located near North Vancouver, British Columbia.
 At Lost Lake in Whistler, there is a "Nudy Dock" where it is acceptable to bathe and sunbathe nude.

Manitoba 
 Naturist Legacy Park, a family friendly facility.
 Patricia Beach. From the furthest parking lot walk the path through the trees to the right, or along the shore when the water is low. It is approximately 200 meters to the nude section, then it winds through the brush for hundreds of meters past that.

Nova Scotia

Ontario
All areas of Ontario, unless otherwise specified by town or city by-laws, allow both males and females to be topless in public.
 Bare Oaks Family Naturist Park is a year-round facility north of Toronto in East Gwillimbury.
 East Haven Club near Ottawa
 Freedom Fields Naturist Ranch near Tamworth
 Jewel Lake Wilderness Park in North Bay
 Lakesun Club near Inverary
 Sunny Glades Naturist Park in Bothwell
 Sunward Naturist Park in Calabogie
 Ponderosa Nature Resort in Flamborough, Ontario
 The Grand Barn was a clothing-optional facility located in eastern Ontario, equidistant between Ottawa, Cornwall, and Montreal.due to land use zoning restrictions the facility ceased operating in 2016
 Turkey Point Provincial Park
 Sandbanks Provincial Park has an unofficial nude beach area away from the mainstream beach area with signs posted against it.

Toronto
 The city of Toronto permits nudity at public events, such as the World Pride Parade & the World Naked Bike Ride.
 Beechgrove Beach, Toronto, located 100 metres east of the parking lot at the end of Beechgrove Drive
 Hanlan's Point Beach on the Toronto Islands is a sandy clothing-optional beach.

Quebec 
There are no officially recognized nude beaches in the province, but there are six spots that have secluded areas where nudity is accepted.
 Meech Lake in Gatineau Park has had an unofficial nude beach for over 70 years, though it is subject to periodic raids from local police.
 Plage du Lac Simon, Duhamel
 Rivière Palmer, Chaudière-Appalaches
 Plage du Parc de la Pointe-Taillon, Lac Saint-Jean
 Plage de Boom Défense, Gaspé Peninsula
 Plage de Cap-aux-Oies, Charlevoix

Prince Edward Island
 Blooming Point Beach, in Prince Edward Island National Park along the northern shore of Prince Edward Island, contains an unofficial clothing-optional beach. The nude section is about a 15–20 minute walk west (to the left) of the parking lot.

Newfoundland and Labrador 
 Soldiers Pond is an unofficial clothing-optional swimming area in St. John's used mainly by locals. From Southside Road, hike Deadman's Bay Path to the top of the hill.

Saskatchewan
 Paradise Beach (Bareass Beach), located just outside Saskatoon

Costa Rica
 Montezuma Beach – Playa Grande is a thirty-minute hike north of Montezuma, with optional nudity.
 Playa Playitas, located west of Manuel Antonio National Park and south of Quepos

Cuba
 Cayo Santa Maria
 Cayo Largo
 Playa la Chocha Loca
 Pito Largo del Sur
 Playa El Pito Corto
 Playa Las Pompas Grandes
 La Mariela

Dominican Republic
 Caliente Caribe, near Abreu in Puerto Plata province. There have been reports that this resort has closed.

French Antilles 
The following beaches in the French Antilles.

Guadeloupe 
 Anse Crawen, not far from Bourg
 Anse Tarare

Martinique 
 Anse Traubaud
 Petite Anse des Salines

St. Barths 
Topless is common on most beaches.
Nudity is encountered at:
 Gouveneur Beach (at the western end)
 Saline beach (towards the east and little further in the small bay called Petite Saline)

Saint Martin 
 Orient Beach (contains an official nude section and is the most popular social nude beach on the island)
 Club Orient (resort1, restaurant and bars located adjacent to the official nude section of Orient Beach)
 Cupecoy (contains a nude section and non-nude section)
 Happy Bay (not officially nude but one side of beach is frequently nude)
 Rouge beach (not officially nude, but after the restaurants it is usual)
 The Jardin d'O Caribbean clothing optional resort is close to three beaches that are naturist-nudist friendly (Orient Bay, Happy Bay and Pinel Island).
 Topless is permitted on all beaches on the French side of the island, but many secluded beaches attract nude sunbathers.
 Residence Adam & Eve: a warm and friendly clothing optional resort located at Orient Bay close the Orient Nude Beach. Nude catamaran sailing cruises are also available.
1 The resort "Club Orient" was totally destroyed by Hurricane Irma in 2017 and declared bankruptcy

Grenada
 Beach off Sandals LaSource Resort
 Laluna, St. George's

Jamaica
 Couples Negril (nude beach section)
 Couples Sans Souci
 Couples Tower Isle (nude island)
 Hedonism II in Negril
 Negril Cabins Resort
 Rolcata Resort & Spa
 Sandals Royal Caribbean (backside of private island)
 Seven Mile Beach, Negril
 Sunset Beach Resort & Spa
 Nude Lun Park
 Grand Bahia Principe has a nude section at the back of the resort

Mexico

Beach nudity in Playa Zipolite, Mexico is legal.  Elsewhere, Mexican law condemns only "immorality" and thus the issue ends up being a matter of the judge's criteria.

Zipolite, Oaxaca 
 As of 2016, Playa Zipolite is Mexico's first legal nude beach.  A "free beach" and unofficially nudist for more than 30 years, this beach is reputed to be the best place for nudism in the country.  The numerous nudists, and the long tradition, make it safe for nudism and naturism.  Annually since 2016, on the first weekend of February, Zipolite has hosted Festival Nudista Zipolite organized by the Federación Nudista de México.
 Hotel Nude is Zipolite's first nude-optional resort/hotel.
 CAMP - opening in 2021, it will be an au naturel hostel and gathering center for communities of 50-100 (also located in Zipolite) with cabañas, a dormitory, and typical amenities.

Tulum, Playa del Carmen, Quintana Roo 
 The Intima Resort (formerly Mak Nuk) is a nude resort in the town of Tulum.  It is not located on the beach but nude sunbathing is accessible in the biosphere area close to the resort.
 AZULIK is a clothing optional resort in Tulum. Beside Papaya Playa Project, its beach is accessible for nude sunbathing.
 Playa del Carmen, Quintana Roo, has a beach in town located near the Cozumel ferry terminal that allows topless sunbathing, at least informally. Within Playa del Carmen, there's a strip of beach called Kentenah which hosts some secluded resorts such as Hidden Beach that is designed for nudists. Some topless sunbathing also occurs at Tulum, although not as commonly as in Playa del Carmen. There are also adult lifestyle hotels like Desire and Desire Pearl.
 Isla Mujeres, Quintana Roo, has beach areas where topless sunbathing occurs, especially at Playa Norte. Nude bathers are advised to use caution as local police do issue citations.

Puerto Vallarta, Jalisco 
 Destilerías, Nayarit, north of Puerto Vallarta, and just north of Bucerias, Nayarit, has a beach where nudism is "tolerated".

Dutch Antilles

Bonaire 
 Sorobon Resort on Bonaire used to be a naturist resort, but since 2011, after change of ownership it switched to a family and Wellness oriented approach.

Curaçao 
Curaçao has no legal nude beaches at this time.
 The Natural Curaçao is a clothing optional mini-resort in Willemstad that also offers boat trips.
 There are also several beaches on the west end of the island that are okay with topless sunbathing.

Sint Maarten 
The island of St Martin has a Dutch side, Sint Maarten, and a French side, Saint Martin. Orient Bay on the French side has a nudist section. Club Orient, a family-friendly clothing-optional beach resort, is on Orient Bay.

Panama
 Isla Contadora (especially at Playa de las Suecas) in the Pearl Islands

St. Lucia
 Ladera Resort

Trinidad and Tobago
 Number Five, Trinidad - members-only nudist club
 Back Bay, Tobago - nude bathing is practiced (illegally)

United States
Additional and up-to-date information on public and private locations may be obtained on the web sites of the American Association for Nude Recreation (AANR) and The Naturist Society (TNS). and on this Nudist Resort map listing.

Alabama 
 Bluff Creek Falls Campground Steele, Alabama
 Gymno-Vita Park is a  AANR affiliated campground for couples and families only near Pell City
 Camp Rock Bottom in Sand Rock
 Parksland Retreat in Talledega, Alabama

Permanently Closed Nudity Places:
 Black Bear Camp in Waverly {CLOSED}
 The ReTreat in Horton {CLOSED}
 Spring Creek Campground & Resort in Geneva {CLOSED}

Alaska
Public nudity is illegal in Alaska (no social places). Toplessness is legal when practiced without the intention of offending others.

Arizona
Public nudity is illegal in Arizona. However, Verde Hot Springs (springs only – not the campground) is traditionally nude.  There are a few clothing-optional gay resorts and traditional clothing optional B&B's in Phoenix. Tucson's Upper Tanque Verde Creek is a popular social nudity spot. The lower trail leads to a series of pools and waterfalls along Tanque Verde Creek. The Upper Trail is a quick, 10-minute hike to a well-liked swimming and sunning spot used by sunbathers of both sexes clothed and unclothed.
 Shangri La Ranch in New River is a family-oriented facility that welcomes everyone interested in naturism.
 Mira Vista Resort in Marana is a family oriented clothing-optional resort that opened in May 2006.
 Clothing Optional B&B in Cave Creek
 Valle de Vistas Clothing Optional B&B in Sedona
 El Dorado Hot Spring in Tonopah.
 The Magic Circle is located in a clothing-optional portion of the La Posa South Long Term Visitor Area (LTVA) south of Quartzsite operated by the US Bureau of Land Management.
 Royal Villa in Phoenix is a male only clothing optional hotel which offers a day pass for male Phoenix residents only.  Also, only people traveling from cities outside Phoenix can stay here. Nudity is accepted in all areas of inner property except for hotel lobby.

2017 : Opened in Phoenix, Arizona is the Arizona Sunburst Inn, which caters to males only and, unlike Royal Villa, does not offer a day pass. Rooms are on a strictly rental basis and nudity is accepted poolside. Also on, and/or inside the property.

Arkansas
Public nudity is illegal in Arkansas in the presence of the opposite sex; however, same-sex nudity is legal in Arkansas.
 Magnetic Valley Resort in Eureka Springs is a private men-only resort. The pool and bar areas are clothing optional.

California
 Alameda County
 The Sequoians, a nudity-required nudist club located in Castro Valley
 DeAnza Springs Resort, Over five hundred acres of large RV sites and rental units. Anza-Borrego State Park is the northern border to the resort.
 Del Norte County
 El Dorado County
 American River down river from the Route 49 highway bridge. Biking path is on the south side of the vehicle bridge, after crossing the old concrete railroad bridge, several small trails lead down a steep bank to a series of large rocks outcropping on the river.
 Humboldt County
 Baker's Beach, in Humboldt County between Trinidad and Moonstone. Humboldt North Coast Land Trust claims to own this property.
 College Cove Beach is in the town of Trinidad, north of Eureka in northern Humboldt County.
 Inyo County
 Keough Hot Springs – Hot running creek with pools located near Bishop. Note: the resort at the end of the road is not clothing optional.
 Saline Valley Warm Springs – hot springs in Death Valley National Park
 Lake County
The center was closed for rebuilding after the Valley Fire of 2015.
 Los Angeles County
 Arroyo del Sol Clothing Optional B&B in Pasadena-Altadena is part of Clothing Optional Home Network and is an AANR Participating Business.
 Marin County
 Red Rock Beach, a half mile south of Stinson Beach
 Mendocino County
 Mono County
 Little Hot Creek east of Mammoth Lakes. To find this clothing-optional hot springs, you'll need a good local map showing dirt roads.
 Monterey County
 Zmudowski State Beach – Unofficial clothing-optional "hidden beach" within Moss Landing.
 Garrapata State Park – Clothing-optional beach 15 minutes drive south of Carmel.
 Marina Beach State Park (South side) – A 15-minute drive north of Monterey. 15 minute hike over the sand dunes.
 Napa County
 Meadowlark Country House – A twenty-room/suite bed and breakfast outside Calistoga with a large mineral-rich water pool area, Jacuzzi and sauna. Clothing-optional mineral water pool, hot tub, sauna, and sun bathing terraces are available with the purchase of a day pass at $50 per person.
 Nevada County
 South Yuba River – Hoyts Crossing is an area of swimming holes on the South Yuba, about a 20-minute hike upriver from the Highway 49 crossing (north of Nevada City).
 Orange County
It was clothing optional until 2010.
 Riverside County
 Anahata Springs Spa and Retreat near Palm Springs is a clothing-optional zen spa and retreat with hot spring pool and spa.
 Living Waters Spa in Desert Hot Springs. This swimsuit optional spa has hot spring water pools, and the spa is an easy introduction to social nudity. TripAdvisor named them as one of the Top 25 Small Hotels in the US for 2013, 2014, and 2015.
 Glen Eden Nudist Resort – One of the largest membership-owned clubs in the country, Glen Eden, located in Corona, is Southern California's premier nudist destination.
 Sea Mountain Couples Nude Resort and Spa Hotel. Four diamond hotel and resort and lifestyles club with mineral water pools and celebrity clientele ranked best of the US by Los Angeles Times.
 Desert Sun Resort One of the premier nudist resorts in North America. Located in Palm Springs.
 Sea Mountain Nude Resort and spa hotel Clothing Optional Resort and Spa in Desert Hot Springs is a popular nudist vacation resort. It is perfect for couples trying nude vacations for the first time. They won the Best of the Palm Springs Valley award in December 2017 for being the best Boutique hotel. Featuring a unique tobacco-free experience, they have one of the highest repeat guest rates in the travel industry.
 Tuscany Manor Clothing Optional Resort in Palm Springs. It is for couples and singles at the age 21+.
 Sacramento County
 Laguna del Sol – Clothing-optional resort in Wilton, near Sacramento, featuring camping and RV spots, a lake, heated swimming pools, spas, walking tracks, stores, restaurant and event center.
 San Bernardino County
 Deep Creek Hot Springs – Clothing-optional hot spring in the San Bernardino National Forest near Apple Valley
 Olive Dell Ranch – Naturist resort in Colton, a few miles from San Bernardino and Riverside. Olive Dell Ranch is southern California's favorite nudist resort for families and couples.
As of 2016 it is permanently closed.
 Starland – a clothing optional campground and retreat, located near Joshua Tree.
 San Diego County
 Black's Beach in La Jolla, San Diego, is one of the largest and most-visited nude beaches in the United States. THe northern part of the beach is in a state park where nudity is officially permitted, while the southern part is on city property where nudity is illegal but somewhat tolerated.
 DeAnza Springs Resort – Naturist resort in Jacumba. DeAnza Springs is the largest and one of the newest clothing optional resorts in North America.
 San Francisco City and County

 San Francisco has traditionally tolerated public nudity to a greater degree than anywhere else in California. A law passed by the city council in the fall of 2012 and which went into effect in February 2013 made public nudity an infraction outside of a few designated areas. Female toplessness remains legal throughout the city.
 Baker Beach is a beach of the National Park Service in San Francisco. The north end of the beach (closest to the Golden Gate Bridge) is officially sanctioned as clothing-optional.
 Land's End – Within the Golden Gate National Recreation Area, Land's End beach is a beautiful and legal nude beach in the San Francisco area. It is reached only by a steep, difficult trail.
 San Luis Obispo County
 Pirates Cove near San Luis Obispo
 San Mateo County
 San Gregorio nude beach might be the oldest continuously active nude beach in the United States. San Gregorio beach is the largest of about 20 clothing-optional beaches along the coast between San Francisco and Santa Cruz.
 Devil's Slide or Gray Whale Cove is the only officially sanctioned nude state-owned beach in California. Run for years by a private concessionaire who provided the only access to this remote beach, the State of California took over its operation. NOTE: The California State Park system officially outlaws nudity unless the area is specifically set aside for such use (e.g., dressing areas).
 Santa Barbara County
 Bates Beach in Carpinteria was formerly clothing optional, but nudity is now banned. Santa Barbara Based Nude Beach Alliance is fighting a legal battle to bring back clothing optional.
 More Mesa Beach – Considered one of the most pristine and picturesque clothing-optional beaches in California, More Mesa has been a destination for nudists since at least the late 1960s. Located between Hope Ranch Beach and Goleta Beach, this County beach is accessible by following a footpath through the meadow and down a steep but well-maintained staircase carved into the cliffside. The clothing optional area begins to the immediate right of the staircase and continues for approximately a third of a mile to the westernmost point.
 Montecito Hot Springs - natural hot springs accessed via Hot Springs Trail in Montecito.
 Santa Clara County
 Lupin Lodge – Naturist resort in Los Gatos. Memberships available as well as day/night passes. Camping available. Just south of Silicon Valley, off Highway 17 (Idylwild Road exit).
 Santa Cruz County
 Bonny Doon Beach – About a 10–15 minute drive from Santa Cruz on North Highway 1. Across from Bonny Doon Road. Nude beach is down the cliff – there are two sections of beach – the south end is for clothed beachgoers, and the north end, divided from the main beach by a large rock, is for nude sunbathers.
 Santa Cruz – The beach adjacent to the Santa Cruz Seaside County Beach Boardwalk. All bathers regardless of gender may go topless by county ordinance.
 Sonoma County
 The Russian River is right along U.S. 101 and CA 116.

Colorado
 Female toplessness is allowed in the cities of Denver, Boulder and Fort Collins, since these cities do not make any distinction between female toplessness and male bare chested. On February 15, 2019, The 10th Circuit Court of Appeals ruled in favor of Free the Nipple as to female toplessness being equal to male toplessness. This decision legalized female toplessness in the state. 
 Mountain Air Ranch in Indian Hills.
 Orvis Hot Springs, a clothing-optional natural hot springs in Ridgway.
 North end of the Boulder Reservoir, near Boulder. (No longer allowed and tickets are issued by law enforcement)
 Valley View Hot Springs and the Orient Land Trust —  of clothing optional recreation in the San Luis Valley. Chlorine-free swimming pool, hiking trails, soaking ponds; accommodations include tent camping sites, vehicle camp sites & cabin rentals.
 Strawberry Hot Springs (only after dark) — Steamboat Springs
 Dream Canyon just outside Boulder
 Desert Reef Hot Spring in Florence.
 Dakota Hot Springs (formerly known as "The Well"), in Penrose.
 The "rock" just west of the Wedgewood Restaurant on Boulder Canyon Drive. Look for the Chapman Drive Trailhead parking on the left as you move up the canyon after the turn off to the restaurant.
 Tsujataism a group formed in 2017 in Boulder, Colorado that hold nude meditation rituals. these rituals are hosted by a Master and a Goddess and are communally funded.
 Left Hand Creek - 40°06'16.3"N 105°20'15.4"W - Sandy river banks and created pools make for a lovely little skinny dipping experience.

Connecticut
The resort has 95 wooded level sites on a mountain ridge.
 Solair Family Nudist Resort in Woodstock is a family oriented nudist resort and campground, owned and operated by its members.
 B&G of Connecticut, East Hartford, private social club for male naturists

Delaware

 Shore Inn the gay men motel in Rehoboth Beach
 Some of these nude beaches in the historic downtown district in the Delaware state park Fort DuPont State Park named after Rear Admiral Samuel Francis Du Pont at the New Castle County

District of Columbia
 Potomac Rambling Bares is a non-landed club that has since its founding in 1984 provided a comfortable atmosphere for nudists in the Washington, D.C. metropolitan area, Maryland and Virginia areas.

Florida

Public beaches
 Apollo Beach inside the Canaveral National Seashore near New Smyrna Beach on the Atlantic Coast of Florida. The accepted clothing-optional sunbathing area is around the boardwalk by Parking Area 5. Unlike Playalinda Beach (see below), this part of the national seashore is in Volusia County, which does not have an anti-nudity ordinance. Scarce parking (29 spaces) usually limits visitors to fewer than a hundred at a time. (There is another Apollo Beach in Hillsborough County, Florida, that has a very small beach inside Tampa Bay and very close to the TECO electric plant. This is not a naturist beach and violators are fined.)
 Blind Creek Beach – located just south of Ft. Pierce at 5460 S Ocean Dr (State Road A1A) on Hutchinson Island. It belongs to Florida Power and Light, but is managed by St. Lucie County Parks Dept. It is a "primitive" beach with limited improvements. There is no fresh water, so visitors must bring what they need. It is not an "official" nude beach, but has a long history of naturist use. The nudist section is south of the access trail. There were now plans to recognize it as an official nude beach. The beach was formally recognized by the County Commission on June 2, 2020.
 Boca Chica Beach on Boca Chica Key near Key West. There are no legal nude beaches in Key West, but Boca Chica has been used by locals for clothing-optional use and kept it secret for years. The secluded area has some sandy beach areas but not wide. There are no facilities or anywhere to clean up so visitors have to remove anything they bring. The road to the beach is near mile marker 10 on the Overseas Highway on Big Coppitt Key. Turn south on SR 941 or Boca Chica Road, driving through Geiger Key and back to Boca Chica Key.
 Haulover Beach, in Miami-Dade County between Bal Harbour and Sunny Isles Beach, is one of the most popular nude beaches in North America. Haulover Nude Beach is part of the county's Haulover Beach Park situated between the Intracoastal Waterway and the Atlantic Ocean. This  stretch of white sand shore, open ocean surf, various shaded picnic facilities, beautifully landscaped sand dunes, and concession stands has attracted as many as 7,000 people on a single day. The northern nude area is officially recognized as clothing-optional with official signs and is only a part of the Haulover Beach Park but attracts 66% to 85% of park visitors.
 Playalinda Beach in Titusville is part of Canaveral National Seashore and operated by the Merritt Island National Wildlife Refuge (US Fish & Wildlife Service). Nudity has long been allowed, and there is an unofficial clothing-optional beach located at the north end of Parking Lot 13 and north of dune crossover 13B. While there is no federal law restricting nude sunbathing, Brevard County passed an ordinance against nudity, but the Sheriff is not enforcing it pending a challenge to the constitutionality of the ordinance.
 South Beach in Miami Beach permits topless sunbathing, partially due to the large number of foreign tourists and immigrants that frequent the beach. Additionally, a few hotel pools in Miami Beach also allow female toplessness.

Private resorts and campgrounds
 Caliente Tampa is a clothing-optional resort in Land o' Lakes. A membership is required to visit, but visitors can obtain daily memberships. The resort has a hotel on site with a large pool, many smaller pools, a hot tub and volleyball pools.
 Camp David near Inverness is a private , secluded clothing-optional campground catering to gay men. The camp is heavily wooded with three small lakes. Membership is required, but day passes may be purchased.
 Casa Alegra Clothing Optional B&B in Sarasota County is part of Clothing Optional Home Network and is an AANR Participating Business.
 Eden RV Resort (formally, Gulf Coast Resort) in Hudson in Pasco County is a  RV resort north of Tampa.
 First Coast Naturists is a non landed, AANR chartered and TNS affiliated Meetup Group, based in Jacksonville, Florida, and encourages nonsexual nudist recreation in the First Coast region of Northeast Florida.
 The Island Group in Land o' Lakes is a  private nudist island, founded in 1948 with a nice quiet atmosphere, a lovely pool and hot tub.
 Key West Private Charters offers 4-hour, 6-hour, 8-hour snorkeling, scuba diving, sunset and custom power boat trips on which nudity is permitted. The trip launches from the Dream Catchers boat dock at College Drive in Key West. There are other companies offering private charters that allow nudity as long as the boat is  out in the sea where nudity is legal.
 Lake Como Family Nudist Resort in Lutz, Pasco County is Florida's oldest, which began operation on April 25, 1941. Six lakes are within or border the property. Non-resident memberships in the resort are available, and free tours are available for those interested.
 Lake Linda Circle in Land o' Lakes is a fenced nudist community on Leonard Road, founded in 1998 is probably the first residential nudist mobile home park in Florida, and maybe North America.
 Next Generation Naturists is a non-landed organization promoting the nonsexual naturist lifestyle, focused to the young adult (18- to 35-year-old) demographic.
 Paradise Lakes in Pasco County is a clothing optional lifestyle resort, which is famed for their "bubble parties" and water volleyball. It changed ownership in 2021 and is now focusing more on lifestyle/swinger clientele. </ref>
 Paradise Pines RV Park in Lutz is a nudist RV park with 81 lots, a pool and clubhouse.
 Riverboat Club on Caliente Boulevard in Land o' Lakes was formed in July 1990 and has since grown into a popular vacation spot. It is a private membership club and is home to more than 25 people year round. Hundreds of Tampa Bay area naturists visit regularly and during special events. Many visitors camp out for a day, weekend, monthly or year-round.
 Riviera Naturist Resort in Pace features activities on-site in a secluded part of Santa Rosa County in the Florida Panhandle.
 Sunny Sands Resort, is a clothing-optional resort community located in Pierson, Florida.
 SunSport Gardens in Palm Beach County offers acres of natural outdoors with recreation facilities and camping.
 Suwannee Valley Resort in White Springs, Florida, is a AANR chartered clothing-optional resort, featuring pools, hot tubs, bars and restaurant facilities. SVR is situated next to the Suwannee River and provides discounts for veterans, law enforcement and firefighters.
 Vitambi Springs near Clewiston is a private all-male clothing optional campground. The resort is nearly 200 acres. Membership is required.
 The Woods RV Park in Land o' Lakes is an upscale clothing-optional RV park and resort that opened in 2008 with lots for sale and for rent. It boasts a  clubhouse and heated pool.

Georgia
 Bell Acres Resort in Maysville. AANR and TNS affiliated.
 Hidden River Resort in Saint George, with a mailing address of Sanderson, Florida. AANR affiliated.
 In the Woods in Canon
 Mountain Creek Grove Resort in Cleveland. This is an adult only resort.
 Native Woods Naturist Park in Darien. AANR and TNS affiliated.
 River's Edge in Dewy Rose
 Serendipity Park in Cleveland. AANR and TNS affiliated.  It is a family-friendly facility offering day visits, overnight tent or RV camping, and rental cabins as well as lot spaces for full-time or part-time living.
 The Naturist Escape in East Ellijay. This is a non-landed, all ages welcome, social naturist organization that is based out of the north Georgia mountains.

Hawaii

Idaho
 Bare Mountain Retreat is a family-oriented facility located on 130 private acres just 30 minutes from Boise, Idaho. It is affiliated with the American Association for Nude Recreation (AANR) and AANR-Northwest, and has operated since 1981.
Located on the Nez Perce-Clearwater National Forest, the warm water pools are about a  hike in and known for the clothing-optional atmosphere.
 Goldbug Hot Springs south of Salmon, Idaho. The pools are about a  hike in.

Illinois
 The Chicago Fun Club is a non-landed social nudist club.
 Until 1995, nude night swimming occurred at Oak Street Beach in Chicago and other beaches on Lake Michigan, prior to its elimination by police patrols.
Approximately  of sunny and shaded areas situated amid  of farmland. The camp facilities are approved by the State of Illinois each year.
 Nude Dudes Chicago is a group of 18- to 40-year-old gay men who enjoy public nudity and host events in and around the Chicago area all year round.
 Paradisecreeks Retreat near Aurora hosts nudist events on Wednesdays and Thursdays. They feature indoor and outdoor pools and hot tubs. There is sand and water volleyball, as well as a huge tanning deck. A nice buffet is included. A good selection of lawn sports are provided. www.paradisecreeks.com
 NUD R US Family Nudist Club  (NFNC) is a small Christian and home-based nudist club near Bloomington that is open to all of good moral character.

Indiana
 Nude sunbathing and swimming has occurred at Indiana Dunes State Park and Indiana Dunes National Park both historically and contemporarily; especially around the west end of Miller Beach’s Lake Street Beach. This area has been a gathering place for homosexuals for decades.
There are designated clothing-optional areas of Our Haven that are open year-round. With only a 20-minute drive to the casino, restaurants, or the West Baden Springs Hotel there is plenty to experience.
 Lake O' Woods Club in Valparaiso is a member-owned, family oriented, cooperative nudist club that was founded in 1933.
 Ponderosa Sun Club in Roselawn. The purpose of this club is to promote health and happiness for its members. Ponderosa Sun Club opened in 1965. The focus of the club's activities is their  swimming pool with concrete sunning apron and a formal garden.
 Sunshower Country Club in Centerville is a family nudist resort established in 1959.
 Sunny Haven Recreation Park in Granger, located near South Bend, has been the home to family nude recreation in northern Indiana since 1947.
  Sunaura Resort is an adults-only clothing-optional camp. Overnight RV camping is available. Location has a large pool, wooded scenic trails and weekend parties at the roundhouse.
 Casita en el Lago Clothing Optional Bed and Breakfast is located in NW Indiana near Valparaiso.  It is part of Clothing Optional Home Network and is an AANR participating business.

Iowa

Some clothing optional resorts are for adults only in Iowa.
 L.V. Campground in Coggon

Kansas
Public nudity is legal in Kansas, in all jurisdictions, under state law.
 Camp Gaea is a non-denominational retreat center/campground located just east of McLouth that tolerates nudity in some areas.
 Lake Edun  is a family naturist facility maintaining meadows, woods and over 3 miles of trails centered around a 10-acre lake featuring 2 sand beaches on 60 acres just a few miles SW of Topeka and is affiliated with The Naturist Society.
 Prairie Haven in Scranton is a family nudist club on  affiliated with AANR and The Naturist Society.
 Sandy Lane Club in Hutchinson is associated with AANR.

Kentucky

 KYANA Naturists in Louisville and Lexington
 Bluegrass Naturists in Nicholasville and Lexington
 Central Kentucky Family United Nudists (CKFUN) in Lexington
 Kentuckiana Gay Nudists in Frankfort

Louisiana
 Indian Hills Nudist Park, a private campground community of nudist enthusiasts in Slidell.
 Sandy Bares, a private campground in Metairie.
  Bayou Allure Clothing Optional B&B in Baton Rouge is part of Clothing Optional Home Network.

Maine
Female toplessness is allowed throughout the state, since Maine's law only prohibits the public exposure of the genitals.
 Twin Ponds Lodge is a private membership-only social club 25 minutes from Waterville. It is adult only and male only. In addition to the ponds, the resort has  of fields and woods as well as some indoor facilities and is open year-round.
 Sherwood Forest in Dover-Foxcroft
 Maine Coast Solar Bares in Augusta
 Frenchman's Hole in Newry
 Lakewood Park in Bar Harbor
 Richmond Sauna Bed & Breakfast in Richmond

Maryland
 Maryland Area Naturist Association is the first ever and currently the only family nudist club in Baltimore County and City.
 Camp Ramblewood in Darlington is available for groups wishing to host clothing-optional events.
 Maryland Health Society in Davidsonville is a privately owned nudist club.
 Pine Tree Associates in Annapolis, was founded in 1934, and is a cooperatively-owned family nudist club. Conveniently located between Baltimore and Washington, DC on 96 secluded acres. The club features: outdoor pool, indoor pool, large hot tub, tennis and pickleball courts. Camping and RV sites are also available. Open year-round.

Massachusetts
 Cape Cod:
 Marstons Mills: Sandy Terraces Associates is a family oriented, co-operative campground.
 Provincetown: Public nudity has at times been tolerated on the beaches around Provincetown, especially in the small area that is not part of the Cape Cod National Seashore.
 Truro: Public nudity is unofficially tolerated on Longnook Beach.
 Cummington, Westfield River, Chesterfield State Forest downstream of Swift River, Parking limited, look for overcrowded pulloff along rt 9.
 Huntington, Knightville Dam  Westfield River: follow roadway upstream to the most northern portion of the flood basin, park in the provided lot, hike  beyond the yellow fireroad gate.
 Hancock: Berkshire Vista Nudist Resort is a family oriented, privately owned facility.
 Nantucket: Public nudity is unofficially tolerated in the area between Miacomet Beach and Surfside Beach.
 Martha's Vineyard:
 Moshup Beach in Aquinnah contains an area where public nudity is unofficially tolerated. (Both the Aquinnah area and Moshup Beach are often called "Gay Head", the former legal name of the town of Aquinnah.)
 Lucy Vincent Beach in Chilmark contains an area where public nudity is permitted.
 MVBoat offers private charter trips on which nudity is permitted.

Michigan
 Nuance Bed and Breakfast in Battle Creek
 Turtle Lake Resort in Union City
 Northaven Resort in Brooklyn
 Cherry Lane Resort in North Adams
 Forest Hills Club in Saranac
 Spruce Hollow Campground in Mesick
 Whispering Oaks Nudist Resort in Oxford

Minnesota
 Avatan in East Bethel (affiliated with AANR)
 Oakwood Club is located 35 minutes north of Minneapolis–St. Paul and is a private AANR-affiliated landed club.
 Two Creeks Campground is located 69 minutes north of Minneapolis–St. Paul and is a clothing optional association.
 Several other landless clubs operate in the northern suburbs of Minneapolis and St. Paul.

Mississippi
 West Ship Island, near Gulfport
 Sandy Bares Travel Club in Moss Point
 Running Bare B&B in Long Beach

Missouri
 Cactus Canyon Campground, located just outside Ava, caters to the gay/bi/straight male population who enjoys nudity in the outdoors. Located on 720 private rolling acres of the Ozark Mountains.
It is affiliated with The Naturist Society. Resort is now closed (2016) due to owner's retirement.
 Heartland Naturists is a non-landed group organized in Kansas City affiliated with The Naturist Society.

Montana
Nudity is not against the law in the rural areas of Montana, as long as it's basic simple nudity and is not accompanied by any sexual activity or any activity intending to affront or alarm another or for sexual gratification. Here is the Montana law regarding nudity:
MCA 45-5-504. Indecent exposure

Use caution, while nudity is legal in rural Montana it doesn't mean that you can't be cited for something like disturbing the peace if you were creating a nuisance.

However, many towns and municipalities have separate ordinances restricting nudity within town and city limits.

Lolo Hot Springs allows nudity (21+) in the evening time until closing, on Wednesdays & Sundays

Bridger, Montana A clothing-optional primitive campground and recreation area called club33naked.Com is a 33-acre Club, nudity is sometimes required in the inner most portion of the club grounds in the pool, hot tub, and sauna area called zorrogarden.Com
It is a Club and not a resort, so you need to request membership.

Nebraska
 Cornhusker Recreation Club near Omaha

Nevada
 Lake Tahoe's Nevada shore has several clothing-optional beaches including
 Secret Cove,
 Chimney Beach,
 Creek Beach also called Secret Creek Beach, or Secret Harbor Creek Beach, in the Washo language it is known as dawmóʔlɨm demšé:gɨl
 Black Sand Beach (named for the black sand from the lower bottom of Lake Tahoe),
 Boaters Beach,
 Whale Beach 1 and 2.
 Black Rock City, in the desert outside of Gerlach, hosts Burning Man where clothing is optional.
 The Mirage's poolside lounge "Bare" in which guests can go topless. This is one of the few hotel pools in Las Vegas that allow female toplessness.
 Blue Moon Resort was a small resort hotel for gay men in Las Vegas. It opened in 2003 with a clothing optional pool compound, steam room and Jacuzzi grotto. the hotel closed permanently as of September 2014.
 Las Vegas Naturists is a private clothing optional resort located in the northwest part of the city.  Only couples are allowed in order to keep the genders balanced, and although is not a swingers resort, children are not allowed due to a city ordinance forbidding naked children in front of adults who are not family or medical personnel.
 Sea Mountain Nude Resort and One Love Temple, located 5 minutes from the Las Vegas Strip, is a lifestyle club and spa for couples only.

New Hampshire
 Cedar Waters Village in Nottingham has operated since 1950. It is a non-secular, heterosexual only park and does not admit single people of any orientation. It is not affiliated with any naturist group.

New Jersey
 Gunnison Beach in Sandy Hook, a part of the National Park Service's multi-state Gateway National Recreation Area, is a clothing-optional beach by custom and is the largest such beach in the Northeastern United States (there are several other public beaches on Sandy Hook where nudity is not tolerated). Gunnison Beach also has a prominent gay nudist area, one of the most popular gay beaches in New Jersey. In 1999, New Jersey passed a law a bill that prohibits all types of nudism on state or municipal beaches, making Gunnison Beach the only legal nude beach in the state, since it is on federal land not subject to state or municipal regulations. Gunnison Beach offers dramatic views of Brooklyn and the Verrazano Narrows Bridge and is officially recognized as clothing-optional with permanent park signs and full lifeguard and police protection. It is the largest clothing-optional beach on the Atlantic coast of the US, and draws more than 5,000 visitors per day on most sunny summer weekends.
 Sunset Beach on the west, bay side of Cape May. This is not a sanctioned nudist area (see previous), but nudity is commonplace here nevertheless.
 Sky Farm Club is a private cooperative in central New Jersey.
 Goodland Country Club is a nudist club in Hackettstown.

New Mexico
 Ten Thousand Waves, Santa Fe. A family-friendly Japanese-style mountain spa resort offering clothing-optional hot tubs, saunas, cold plunges, and suntanning decks. Note: Effective July 2015, only the private tubs and the women's communal tub are clothing-optional; swimsuit bottoms are required in the grand bath at all times.
 Faywood Hot Springs, located north of Deming, is a camping resort with both clothing and clothing optional pools. RV, camping and cabin accommodations are offered for overnight guests.
 Bare Cottage in Coyote NM, Coyote. A clothing optional retreat in Santa Fe National Forest, 30 mins from beautiful Abiquiu Lake and Georgia O'Keeffe country.

Mi Casa Bed and Breakfast in Albuquerque, NM. Privately owned clothing optional resort that feels like home.

New York
Due to a 1992 Court of Appeals ruling (People v. Santorelli et al.), women may be topless anywhere in the state of New York for non-commercial purposes. (A concurring minority opinion reached the constitutional, i.e., equal rights issue, but the majority decision did not.)
 Young Naturists & Nudists America was a website promoting the nonsexual naturist lifestyle, which organized events intermittently, focused to the young adult (21- to 35-year-old) demographic. No longer active.
 Alice Falls, Keeseville. Family-friendly nude sunbathing.
 Skinny Dip Falls, just north of Chautauqua Gorge State Forest between Jamestown and Westfield in Chautauqua County
 Bonita Nudist Retreat in Candor. Formerly known as Buckridge Nudist Park. (No longer a Nudist Resort)
 Cherry Grove Beach in Cherry Grove on Fire Island. This is a largely gay-oriented beach. In February 2013, the Fire Island National Seashore announced its plans to being enforcing New York State's anti-nudity laws on Fire Island.
 Coxing Kill stream at Mohonk Preserve in Gardiner. Sanctioned clothing-optional hiking trail, skinny-dipping, and nude sunbathing.
 Stony Kill Falls, near the Mohonk preserve.  There is a swimming hole at top of falls known as 'nudist pool'. By custom, clothing is optional.
 Empire Haven in Moravia
 Full Tan Sun Club in Sprakers
 Juniper Woods in Catskill Juniper Woods is permanently closed to nude use as of Spring of 2021
 Lighthouse Beach, Fire Island National Seashore, a part of the National Park Service, is just east of Robert Moses State Park on Fire Island, separated from the main part of Long Island by Great South Bay. Once officially recognized with signage, this beach had been used by naturists since the 1950s. In February 2013, the Fire Island National Seashore announced its plans to begin enforcing New York State's anti-nudity laws on Fire Island. The signage was removed, and nude sunbathing does not appear to be allowed.
 Potters Falls in Ithaca. While nudity is fairly common in Ithaca due to the laid-back political environment, Potters Falls is the best-known skinny-dipping spot. And while it is well-known, many people are confused about its location. During the now defunct NorthEast Naturist Festival (formerly held at Empire Haven, see above), the Wednesday of the festival traditionally featured an excursion to Potters Falls.
 Steph's Pond Nudist Retreat in Williamson. No longer open to public since the passing of its owner, Gary,
 Colonial House Inn is a B&B in the Chelsea neighborhood of Manhattan with a clothing optional roof top deck.

North Carolina
Public nudity is considered indecent exposure in North Carolina under * § 14–190.9 which states that

"(a) Unless the conduct is punishable under subsection (a1) of this section, any person who shall willfully expose the private parts of his or her person in any public place and in the presence of any other person or persons, except for those places designated for a public purpose where the same sex exposure is incidental to a permitted activity, or aids or abets in any such act, or who procures another to perform such act; or any person, who as owner, manager, lessee, director, promoter or agent, or in any other capacity knowingly hires, leases or permits the land, building, or premises of which he is owner, lessee or tenant, or over which he has control, to be used for purposes of any such act, shall be guilty of a Class 2 misdemeanor."

Social nudity places in North Carolina include:
 Whispering Pines Nudist Resort near Bird Island in Ocean Isle Beach
 Bar-S-Ranch in Reidsville
 Carolina Foothills Resort (CFR) Chesnee, SC 29323 
 Upper Creek Falls in Newland
 Pea Island in Cape Hatteras
 SW NC - Naked Hike/sunbathing Tuckasegee, NC - this secluded waterfall area frequently has nude sunbathing.
 Pleasure Island North Freeman Park, Carolina Beach, NC - Nude Sun Bathing is unofficial.
 Masonboro Island, NC - only accessible by boat, this animal sanctuary is secluded enough that many people go nude.
 Jordan Lake Multi-Use Area, Apex, NC (35°49'17.1"N 78°58'20.4"W) - This area features sandy, secluded enclaves a short walk from NC-751, just down from the Marathon gas station and before the bridge. Areas not in sight of the highway see frequent, unofficial nude sunbathing.
 Lucky Lovers in New Bern

North Dakota
Public nudity is illegal in North Dakota. Topless sunbathing is not illegal in North Dakota. However, cities across North Dakota may have their own set of laws on going topless.

Ohio
 Green Valley
 Paradise Gardens, Cincinnati was sold and closed as a naturist venue in 2017. It will not reopen.
 Cedar Trails in Peebles
 Dayton Warm Breezes Naturist club in Dayton
 Hillside Haven in Otway
 Northcoast Naturists in Cleveland
 Great Lakes Sunseekers in Toledo
 Alpine Resort in Millersburg
 Cleveland natural resort building

Oklahoma
 Oklahoma Naturists is an adults only nudist bed and breakfast and winery located in Stuart that is affiliated with AANR.

Oregon
Public nudity is generally legal in Oregon, unless it is part of a commercial venture or intended to induce sexual excitement. Some parts of Oregon (including Portland, Eugene, Ashland and Happy Valley) have local laws prohibiting public nudity. However, Oregon law defines nudity as displaying genitals, hence both men and women are allowed to be topfree in public throughout the state.
 The Willamettans – Nudist resort between Marcola and Springfield, near Eugene, The largest nudist resort in the Pacific Northwest.  Featuring camping, cabins and RV spots, year long heated outdoor swimming pool (covered with a dome in winter), hot tub, club house, game room, and restaurant and a bar.
 Rooster Rock State Park along the Columbia River
 Collins Beach on Sauvie Island near Portland.
 Bagby Hot Springs
 Umpqua Hot Springs
 Breitenbush Hot Springs has a clothing-optional policy for all hot springs pools and tubs.
 Glassbar Island Beach, near Eugene on the Willamette River.
 Serenity Mountain Retreat (formerly Squaw Mountain Ranch) - Family nudist resort, high up in the scenic hills of Estacada, Oregon.
 Terwilliger Hot Springs, also known as Cougar Hot Springs.
 Mountaindale Sun Resort (formerly Restful Haven Nudist Resort) in North Plains.
 McCredie Springs
 Alpenglow Ranch Clothing Optional B&B and Resort in Bend is part of Clothing Optional Home Network and is an AANR Participating Business.
 Common Ground Wellness Cooperative in Portland.

Pennsylvania
 The Woods Campground in Lehighton
 H.A.N.G. in Harrisburg
 PSHS Inc. in Mohnton
 Sunny Rest in Palmerton
 West Penn Naturist Links
 White Thorn Lodge in the Pittsburgh suburb of South Beaver Township
 Pen Mar Club in the western Pennsylvania town of Warfordsburg
 Beechwood in Lehighton
 Oneida Campground in New Milford
 Hillside Campground in New Milford

Rhode Island
 Block Island Beach 
 Dyer Woods Nudist Campground in Foster in the western part of the state is a family oriented nudist campground, rather than clothing optional.

South Carolina
 Cedar Creek Resort in Leesville, South Carolina

Tennessee
 Rock Haven Lodge Inc. in Murfreesboro
 Edun Hill Campground in Clinton

Texas
Texas has no laws forbidding female toplessness, although in most parts of the state topless women can still be arrested on the grounds of disorderly conduct. Austin, uniquely, tolerates female toplessness within its city limits. This includes public swimming pools like Barton Springs Pool.

 Hippie Hollow Park is a swimming beach on Lake Travis in Austin where nudity is officially permitted. It is the only legally recognized clothing-optional public park in the state of Texas.
 Bluebonnet Family Nudist Park, Alvord
 Emerald Lake Resort in Porter TX.  northeast of Houston 
 Wildwood Naturists Resort, Decatur
 Freedom RV in Pleasanton, TX
 Healthy Hides, nonlanded nudist group affiliated with AANR.
 Purple Peacock Resort, Palestine, TX

Utah
 Fifth Water Hot Springs, aka Diamond Fork Hot Springs, about 75 minutes southeast of Salt Lake City.

Vermont
Vermont state law prohibits disrobing in public but does not prohibit public nudity, so nudity is allowed anywhere that it has not been specifically prohibited by a city or town. The city of Burlington, for example, has prohibited nudity in public parks, but nudity is allowed anywhere else in the city. Specific locations at which individuals practice social nudity include:
 The Gargoyle House in Wells River, Vermont. A clothing-optional retreat for men open year-round.
 Abbotts Glen-Permanently Closed in Halifax
 Coventry Club and Resort is a family-oriented nudist resort in Milton.
 The Ledges, on the Harriman Reservoir in Wilmington
 The Rock River in Newfane off route 30 has a series of swimming holes.  After the first clothed family swimming hole the rest are nude for families, mixed men and women, and finally gay men.  River access is curated by Rock River Preservation Inc.
 Red Rocks Park in South Burlington
 Starr Farm Beach in Burlington
 Knight Island, an island in Lake Champlain just off St. Albans
 Maple Glen in Sheldon Springs closed as a family-oriented nudist camp in May 2010 due to water quality issues. In April 2010 the camp applied for an Act 250 permit to approve already existing buildings on the property. In August 2014, it was revealed that it would reopen as a non-nudist campground.

Virginia
 White Tail Resort in Ivor

Washington

West Virginia
 Avalon Resort is a more than  clothing-optional resort on a mountainside in the eastern panhandle of West Virginia in Paw Paw.

Wisconsin
 Toadally Natural Garden near Hartford
 Mazo Beach on the Wisconsin River was in regular use by nudists, but it was closed to the public by the Wisconsin Department of Natural Resources in March 2016.
 Valley View Recreation Club near Cambridge
 Camp NCN in Black River Falls claims to be a "sexual freedom" campground, allowing not only nudity, but also public sexual activity on the grounds. The encouragement of public sexual activity is contrary to traditional naturism.

See also

 List of social nudity places in South America

Notes

References

Sources

External links
 American Association for Nude Recreation
 ClothesFree International
 The Naturist Society Foundation
 Federation of Canadian Naturists
 Federacion Nudista de México AC

Naturism in the United States
North America
North America
Social nudity
Lists of places